Berkovits is the name of
Barouh Berkovits (1926–2012), Czech-born medical researcher
Berel Berkovits (1949–2005), Rabbi and Dayan, beit din of London's Federation of Synagogues
Eliezer Berkovits (1908–1992), German orthodox rabbi
Yitzchak Berkovits, Orthodox Jewish rabbi, rosh kollel and posek in Jerusalem

See also
 Berkovich
 Berkovic
 Berkowitz

Jewish surnames
Ukrainian-language surnames